WATN (1240 kHz) is a commercial AM radio station in Watertown, New York.  The station airs a talk radio format and is owned by Community Broadcasters, LLC.

WATN is powered at 1,000 watts using a non-directional antenna.  The transmitter is off Wealtha Avenue in Watertown.

Programming
Most weekday programs on WATN are nationally syndicated conservative talk shows.  Two local programs are heard each weekday: Hotline, an hour-long lunchtime show hosted by former Watertown Mayor Jeffrey Graham, and Live at Five, an afternoon drive time show hosted by Glenn Curry.  Syndicated hosts include Hugh Hewitt, Chris Plante, Sean Hannity, Mark Levin, John Batchelor and Red Eye Radio.

Weekend syndicated hosts include Gary Sullivan (home repair), Bill Handel (law), Ron Ananian (car repair), Michio Kaku (science), Joe Pags, Howie Carr and a Sunday night oldies show.  Most hours begin with world and national news from CBS Radio News.

History
It is Watertown's oldest radio station, beating 1300 WWNY (now 790 WTNY) by three months.

WATN was first owned by the Watertown Broadcasting Corporation with studios at 118 Washington Street.  It originally broadcast with 250 watts and has always used WATN as its call sign.

References

External links
Official Web site

ATN
Radio stations established in 1941
1941 establishments in New York (state)
News and talk radio stations in the United States